Trials 2: Second Edition is a racing video game developed and published by Ubisoft RedLynx. It is available for the Windows operating system through the developer's online store, and Valve's digital distribution system Steam. It was released on March 1, 2008 on the game's website, and May 28, 2008, on Steam. It is a remake of the 2007 game Trials 2.

Gameplay
The objective of the game is to get from the start of the level to the end through a number of obstacles as fast as possible. The player must balance and control their speed so that they don't fall. There is a clock so that the player is pressured into completing the level faster, which ensures replayability. The game also has achievements, similar to Xbox 360 achievements. The game's multiplayer features include highscores, ghost challenge (where the user plays against the ghost of any other player in the high score list) and online player profiles with team, country and player statistics. The game uses 3-D graphics, but is played on a 2-D plane, so the player can only move forwards, backwards, up or down (not left or right).

Reception
Trials 2: Second Edition was well received by critics. The game got an average score of 81% on GameRankings and 82% on Metacritic. GamingTrend gave it 85%, saying "Trials 2 is a throwback to old school gaming. It is a game that doesn't try to be too many things. It takes a single concept and executes it well." 2404.org gave it 9.1/10, simply saying "It's one of those games which hooks you immediately."

See also
Excitebike
Kikstart 2
Motocross Maniacs
Elasto Mania (and its clone Bike or Die)
Trials HD

References

External links
Official website

2008 video games
Motorcycle video games
Racing video games
Video game sequels
Video games developed in Finland
Windows games
Windows-only games
RedLynx games
Trials (series)